This is a list of lighthouses in Réunion.

Lighthouses

See also
 Lists of lighthouses and lightvessels

References

External links

 

Réunion
Lighthouses
Buildings and structures in Réunion
Transport in Réunion